This is a list of aircraft in alphabetical order beginning with 'La' through 'Lh'.

La–Lh

La France 
(Neal La France, Wichita, KS)
 La France Cadet SF

La Mouette
(Fontaine-lès-Dijon, France)
 La Mouette Atlas
 La Mouette Cosmos
 La Mouette Hermes
 La Mouette O2B
 La Mouette Profil
 La Mouette Racer
 La Mouette Revo
 La Mouette Samson
 La Mouette Skybike
 La Mouette Sphinx
 La Mouette SR 210
 La Mouette Top Model
 La Mouette Top Secret
 La Mouette Topless
 La Mouette ZR 250

La Porte 
(La Porte Aircraft Co, La Porte, IN)
 La Porte 1938 Monoplane

LAA 
(Laboratorio Artigiano Aeronautico)
 LAA N.3
 LAA N.3/S
 LAA N.5/R
 LAA N.5Cab
 LAA N.5AQ (AQ - Alta Quota - high altitude)

Labahan
 Labahan Hitchhiker

LaBiche 
(LaBiche Aerospace)
 LaBiche FSC-1

Laboratoire Eiffel
(Laboratoire Eiffel - LE)
 LE C1

Labourdette-Halbronn 
 Labourdette-Halbronn H.T.1
 Labourdette-Halbronn H.T.2

LACAB 
(Les Ateliers de Constructions Aeronautiques Belges)
 LACAB T.7
 LACAB GR.8

Lacey 
(Joseph L Lacey, Tulsa, OK)
 Lacey M-10
 Lacey M-10C VW Twin

Lachassagne 
(Adolphe Lachassagne)
 Lachassagne AL-1
 Lachassagne Al-2
 Lachassagne AL 3
 Lachassagne AL 5
 Lachassagne AL-6
 Lachassagne AL-7

LACO 
(LACO (Fdr: Joe Laven), Desert Hot Springs, CA)
 LACO 125
 LACO 145

Lacroix 
(Léon Lacroix)
 Lacroix 2L.XVI

Lacroix-Bourdin 
(Léon Lacroix & Raymond Bourdin)
 Lacroix-Bourdin 2LB.7
 Lacroix-Bourdin 2LB.9

Lacroix-Nazaris 
(Léon Lacroix & Barret de Nazaris)
 Lacroix-Nazaris LN-1
 Lacroix-Nazaris LN-2
 Lacroix-Nazaris LN-3

Lacroix-Nazaris-Bourdin 
(Léon Lacroix, Barret de Nazaris & Raymond Bourdin)
Lacroix-Nazaris-Bourdin LNB-12

Lacroix-Trussant 
(Léon Lacroix et Gérard Trussant)
 Lacroix-Trussant LT.51 Microplan

Lada Land 
 Lada Land VM-01

Ladd 
(Robert Ladd )
 Ladd Taylor Chihuahua

Ladougne 
(Emile Ladougne)
 Ladougne La Colombe

LAE
(LAE Helicopters Cyprus)
 LAE Ultrasport 496T

L.A.F.
(Ligue Aéronautique Française)
 L.A.F. Desmon flying boat

Lafay
(Louis Etienne Lafay, Brazil)
 Lafay Rio de Janeiro
 Lafay Independência

Lafayette 
(Lafayette Aircraft Works, 230 W Washington Blvd, Los Angeles, CA)
 Lafayette T

Laflamme Helicopters
 Laflamme Helicopters LAF-01

Lage 
(Lage (aircraft constructor))
 Lage 1946 aeroplane

Laird 
(E M Laird Company, 244 South Wichita Street (Wichita) Kansas / E M Laird Airplane Co, 4500 W 83 St (Ashburn Field) Chicago, IL)
 Laird 1912 Monoplane
 Laird#2 1913 Baby Biplane
Laird 1915 Biplane
 Laird B-3
 Laird B-4
 Laird C-6 Special
 Laird Commercial
 Laird Derby Racer
 Laird LC-1B
 Laird LC-AA Commercial
 Laird LC-B
 Laird LC-R Commercial
 Laird LC-B200
 Laird LC-1B200 Commercial
 Laird LC-B300
 Laird LC-1B285
 Laird LC-1B300 Commercial
 Laird LC-DC Speedwing Junior
 Laird LC-DE Speedwing Junior
 Laird LC-DW Solution
 Laird LC-DW300 Super Solution
 Laird LC-DW500 Super Solution
 Laird LC-EW450 Sesquiwing
 Laird LC-R200 Speedwing
 Laird LC-R300 Speedwing
 Laird LC-RW300 Speedwing
 Laird LC-RW450 Speedwing
 Laird Limousine
 Laird S Sportplane
 Laird Standardwing
 Laird Swallow 
 Laird Twin
 Laird-Turner Meteor LTR-14
 Laird-Turner Special

Laird Aircraft Corporation 

(471 W. First St., Wichita, Ks.)
Laird Whippoorwill

Laird 
(Charles L Laird, Wichita, KS, 1930: Aircraft Engineering, Chicago, IL)
 Laird Pierce Arrow
 Laird Special

Laister
 Laister LP-15 Nugget
 Laister LP-49
 Laister-Kauffman TG-4

LAK
(Lietuviškos aviacinės konstrukcijos)
 LAK Genesis 2
 LAK-9
 LAK-12
 LAK-16
 LAK-17
 LAK-19
 LAK-20

Lake 
(Dan Lake, Lake City, KS )
 Lake C-1

Lake 
(Lake Aircraft Corp (pres: Jack Strayer), Sanford, ME)
 Lake LA-4
 Lake LA-4-200 Buccaneer
 Lake LA-4-250 Renegade
 Lake Renegade
 Lake LA-250 Seawolf
 Lake LA-270 Seafury
 Lake LA-270T Turbo Seafury
 Lake LA-270 Turbo Renegade
 Lake Seaplane

Lakes 
 Lakes Hydro-monoplane
 Lakes Sea Bird
 Lakes Water Bird
 Lakes Water Hen

Lam 
(Larry Lam )
 Lam Wanderer

Lambach 
(J.W.H. (Hugo) Lambach)
see:DSA
Lambach HL.I
Lambach HL.II

Lambert 
(Lambert Aircraft Engineering BVBA)
 Lambert Mission 106
 Lambert Mission 108
 Lambert Mission 212
 Lambert Mission 212-100
 Lambert Mission 212-200
 Lambert Mission 212-300
 Lambert Mission 212-400
 Lambert Mission 216

Lambert 
(Monocoupe Div, (S L "Casey") Lambert Aircraft Corporation, St Louis, MO and Long Island, NY)
 Lambert D Box Full
 Lambert G
 Lambert H
 Lambert Monocoach
 Lambert Twin Monocoach

Lamco 
(Danex Engineering Kft)
 Lamco Eurocub

Lammer Geyer Aviation 
 Lammer Geyer Jupiter

Lampich 
(Arpad Lampich)
 Lampich L-1 Mama Kedvence (Mummy's Darling) 
 Lampich L-2 Róma (Rome)
 Lampich L-4 Bohóc (Clown)
 Lampich BL-6
 Lampich BL-7
 Lampich L-9 Veréb (85 hp)
 Lampich L-9 II (Spatz) (85 hp)
 Lampich L-16
 Lampich D-20 Pajtás (Rogue)
 NL XXI (95 hp)
 NL XXII (150 hp)

Lamson 
(Merger of Central Aircraft (crop spraying) & Robert T Lamson Aircraft Co, Yakima, WA)
 Lamson Air Tractor

Lancair 
(Neico Aviation Inc (Fdr: Lance A Niebauer), Redmond, OR)
 Lancair IV
 Lancair IV-P
 Lancair Columbia 300
 Lancair Legacy
 Lancair Propjet
 Lancair 200
 Lancair 235
 Lancair 320
 Lancair 360
 Lancair ES
 Lancair Sentry
 Lancair Super ES
 Lancair Tigress
 Lancair Barracuda
 Lancair Mako

Lancashire 
(Lancashire Aircraft Company)
 Lancashire Prospector

Landgraf 
((Fred) Landgraf Helicopter Co, 135 St at Central Ave, Los Angeles, CA)
 Landgraf H-2
 Landgraf H-3
 Landgraf H-4

Landis & Earle 
((George L) Landis & Earle (Blodgett), 4633 Cramer St, Milwaukee, WI)
 Landis & Earle 101

Landray 
(Etienne-Claude Landray and Gilbert Landray)
 Landray GL.01
 Landray GL.02 Ami Pou
 Landray GL.03 Pouss Pou
 Landray GL.04 Visa Pou (ULM)
 Landray GL.05 (ULM)
 Landray GL.06 Papillon (ULM)
 Landray GL.07 Galopin (Etienne Landray and Philippe-Claude Massé)
 Landray-Massè LM01 Galopin Bis
 Landray JPM 3 Loiret

Lane Automatous Air-Ship Co Lane 
(Lane Automatous Air-Ship Co, San Francisco, CA)
 Lane 1908 Helicopter

Lang 
(Frank Lang, Lockport, IL)
 Lang Sport

Langdon 
(Jesse E Langdon, Bell, CA)
 Langdon 1929 Helicopter

Lange
 Lange Antares

Lange-Billard 
 Lange-Billard 1910 Triangular Wing

Langhurst 
(Louis F Langhurst, Carriere, MI)
 Langhurst Stuka

Langley 
(Dr Samuel P Langley, Washington, DC)
 Langley Aerodrome
 Langley Monoplane

Langley 
(Langley Aircraft Corp (pres: Caleb S Bragg), Port Washington, NY)
 Langley Twin
 Langley NL
 Langley 29-65
 Langley 29-90
 Langley 2-4-90

Langlois 
(Jacques Langlois)
 Langlois JL.2

Lanier 
(Edward H Lanier and son (Edward M), Miami and Jacksonville, FL, Covington, KY, 1943: (E M) Lanier Aircraft Corp, Marlton, NJ)
 Lanier 110 Paraplane Commuter PL-8
 Lanier 120 Paraplane I
 Lanier Paraplane II
 Lanier 443 Paraplane
 Lanier Vacuplane
 Lanier XL-1
 Lanier XL-2
 Lanier XL-3
 Lanier XL-4
 Lanier LVF (a.k.a. XL-5)

Lanitz Aviation 
(Leipzig, Germany)
Lanitz Escapade One
Lanitz Escapade Two
Lanitz Sherwood Ranger

Lansing 
(C R Lansing, Warren, OH)
 Lansing 1931 Monoplane

Lansing 
(Orville G Barnum and Lansing (Ed) Ratelle, Portland, OR)
 Lansing 1T

Lantres-Bouffort 
(Gérard Lantres & Bouffort) (see also:Bouffort-Lantres)
 Lantres-Bouffort LB.20 Elytroplan

Lanzius 
(Lanzius Aircraft Co, New York, NY)
 Lanzius L I Variable Speed Aeroplane (1917)
 Lanzius L II
 Lanzius Variable Speed Aeroplane (1918)

LAPAN 
(Lembaga Penerbangan dan Antariksa Nasional - National Institute of Aeronautics and Space, Indonesia)
 LAPAN XT-400

Lardin 
(Arthur Lardin, W A McCurdy, E Smith, New Castle, DE)
 Lardin AL-1

Lark 
(Lark Aircraft Co (Pres: Romer G Weyant), 217 E Lincoln, Wichita, KS)
 Lark 1927 Biplane

Larkin 

((W Keith) Larkin Aircraft Corp, Watsonville, CA)
 Larkin KC-3 Skylark

Laranudi
 Larnaudi twin-engined flying boat
 Larnaudi single-engined flying boat

Laron 
(Laron Aviation Tech, Borger, TX)
Laron Wizard

Laros 
(OKB Laros)
 Laros-100

Larrieu 
(Jean Larrieu)
 Larrieu JL.2

Larsen 
(Carl Ludvig Larsen)
 Larsen LN-11
 Larsen Special II

Larsen 
(Herman Larsen, Keasbey, NJ)
 Larsen 2-C

Larson 
(Merle Larson & Paul Holmes, Larson Aero Development, Concord, CA)
 Larson D-1 Agricultural Biplane
 Larson F-12 Baby
 Larson Helicopter
 Larson Speed Bird
 Larson-Holmes B
 Larson-Holmes Illusion (B)

Las Brisas 
(Las Brisas Sales, Ozark, MO)
Las Brisas Mohawk

Lasalle 
(LaSalle Aircraft Co (Pres: Claude C. Flagg), 111 Maple St, Joliet, IL, c. 1928-1933: Ottawa, IL)
 LaSalle F-2
 LaSalle Model A Coupe

Lasco 
(Larkin Aircraft Supply Company Ltd, Coode Island, Melbourne)
 Lasco Lascondor
 Lasco Lascoter
 Lasco Lascowl

Lascurain 
( Ing. Ángel de Lascurain y Osio)
 Lascurain Toloche
 Lascurain Sport
 Lascurain Aura
 Lascurain-Salinas XB1
 Lascurain Quetzatcoatl

Laser
(Laser Aerobatics)
 Laser Aerobatics Akro Model Z

Lasher 
(C W Lasher, Winter Springs, FL)
 Lasher Renegade 1
 Lasher Little Thumper

Lasley 
((John A) Lasley Tool & Machine Co, Beloit, MI)
 Lasley Sport

Lasserre
(G. Lasserre - aka SO G.L.3 Libellule)
 Lasserre G.L.3 Libellule

Latécoère 
(Société Industrielle d'Aviation Latécoère [SIDAL or SILAT] from 1922)
(now Groupe Latécoère)
 Latécoère 1 C2
 Latécoère 2
 Latécoère 3
 Latécoère 4
 Latécoère 5
 Latécoère 6
 Latécoère 7
 Latécoère 8
 Latécoère 9
 Latécoère 10
 Latécoère 11
 Latécoère 12
 Latécoère 13
 Latécoère 14
 Latécoère 15
 Latécoère 15H
 Latécoère 16
 Latécoère 17
 Latécoère 18
 Latécoère 19
 Latécoère 20
 Latécoère 21
 Latécoère 22
 Latécoère 23
 Latécoère 24
 Latécoère 25
 Latécoère 26
 Latécoère 27
 Latécoère 28
 Latécoère 29
 Latécoère 225
 Latécoère 290
 Latécoère 291
 Latécoère 292
 Latécoère 293
 Latécoère 294
 Latécoère 295
 Latécoère 296
 Latécoère 297
 Latécoère 298
 Latécoère 299
 Latécoère 30
 Latécoère 300
 Latécoère 301
 Latécoère 302
 Latécoère 310
 Latécoère 32
 Latécoère 340
 Latécoère 350
 Latécoère 360
 Latécoère 370
 Latécoère 380
 Latécoère 381
 Latécoère 382
 Latécoère 383
 Latécoère 384
 Latécoère 385
 Latécoère 386
 Latécoère 410
 Latécoère 420
 Latécoère 430
 Latécoère 440
 Latécoère 441
 Latécoère 442
 Latécoère 443
 Latécoère 460
 Latécoère 470
 Latécoère 480
 Latécoère 490
 Latécoère 491
 Latécoère 492
 Latécoère 493
 Latécoère 494
 Latécoère 500
 Latécoère 501
 Latécoère 502
 Latécoère 503
 Latécoère 510
 Latécoère 520
 Latécoère 521 Lieutenant de Vaisseau Paris
 Latécoère 522
 Latécoère 523
 Latécoère 524
 Latécoère 525
 Latécoère 530
 Latécoère 531
 Latécoère 550
 Latécoère 560
 Latécoère 570
 Latécoère 580
 Latécoère 581
 Latécoère 582
 Latécoère 583
 Latécoère 590
 Latécoère 600
 Latécoère 601
 Latécoère 602
 Latécoère 610
 Latécoère 611
 Latécoère 612
 Latécoère 613
 Latécoère 614
 Latécoère 615
 Latécoère 616
 Latécoère 617
 Latécoère 620
 Latécoère 631 Lionel de Marmier

Latham
(Glen G. Latham)
 Latham Alco Coupe

Latham 
(Société Latham)
 Latham 42
 Latham 43
 Latham 45
 Latham 47
 Latham 47P
 Latham 110
 Latham 230
 Latham C-1
 Latham E-5
 Latham HB.5
 Latham L.1
 Latham L.2
 Latham Trimoteur (cH.1)
 Latham CH.1 (Trimoteur)

Lathrop 
(Lathrop Polytechnical Institute, Kansas City, MO)
 Lathrop School A

Lauér
 Lauér L.II

Lauret
 Lauret l'Ailette

Laville 
(André Laville / BNK - Buro Novyikh Konstruktsii)
 Laville DI-4
 Laville PS-89

Lavochkin 
 Lavochkin-Gorbunov-Goudkov LaGG-1
 Lavochkin-Gorbunov-Goudkov LaGG-3
 Lavochkin La-5
 Lavochkin La-7 "Fin"
 Lavochkin La-9 "Fritz"
 Lavochkin La-11 "Fang"
 Lavochkin La-15 "Fantail" "Type 21"
 Lavochkin Aircraft 120 La-9 precursor
 Lavochkin Aircraft 126 La-9 precursor
 Lavochkin Aircraft 150 "Type 3"
 Lavochkin Aircraft 152 "Type 4"
 Lavochkin Aircraft 154
 Lavochkin Aircraft 156 "Type 5"
 Lavochkin Aircraft 160 Strelka "Type 6"
 Lavochkin Aircraft 174
 Lavochkin Aircraft 174D
 Lavochkin Aircraft 174TK
 Lavochkin Aircraft 168 "Type 15"
 Lavochkin Aircraft 176
 Lavochkin Aircraft 180 (UTI La-15 / La-15UTI)
 Lavochkin Aircraft 190
 Lavochkin Aircraft 200
 Lavochkin La-250 'Anakonda'

Lavoisier 
(Pierre Lavoisier)
 Lavoisier LP.24

Lavorini 
(Nedo Lavorini)
 Lavorini Flying Flea

Lawhorn 
(Jerry L Lawhorn, Anchorage, AK)
 Lawhorn Kee Bird
 Lawhorn LA-3

Lawrence 
(George Lawrence )
 Lawrence 1909 Biplane

Lawrence 
(Lawrence Institute of Technology, Southfield, MI)
 Lawrence Special

Lawrence-Lewis 
(George R Lawrence, Chicago IL. 1915: Lawrence- (Harry S) Lewis Aeroplane Co, Chicago, IL)
 Lawrence-Lewis A-1
 Lawrence-Lewis B-1

Lawson 
((Alfred William) Lawson Airplane Co, Green Bay and Milwaukee, WI, 1925: Lawson Aircraft Co, New York, NY)
 Lawson C-2 Air-Line
 Lawson L-4 Air-line (a.k.a.Midnight Air-Liner)
 Lawson MT-1
 Lawson MT-2
 Lawson Pursuit

Lay Brothers 
(Henry and Jack D Lay, Helena, MT)
 Lay Brothers LT-1
 Lay brothers SL-4

Layzell Gyroplanes 
 Layzell Cricket 
 Layzell Merlin

Lazor-Rautenstrauch 
(Jim Blick, Bethany, CT)
 Lazor-Rautenstrauch 1950 Monoplane (Belle of Bethany)

Lazarov 
(Zvetan Lazarov / DAR) (Cyrillic:Лазаров)
 Laz-1
 Laz-2
 Laz-3
 Laz-4
 Laz-5
 Laz-6
 Laz-7
 Laz-7M
 Laz-8
 Laz-9
 Laz-10H
 Laz-11
 Laz-12
 Laz-13
 Laz-14

LCA 
(LCA Srl.)
 LCA LH 212 Delta

L.D.
 L.D. Ca2

Leach 
((Ronald) Leach Aero Service, Main & Franklin Sts, Hartford, MI)
 Leach 1933 Biplane

Leader 
(Leader Aircraft Co (Pres: Karl Bjorkenheim), 4114 East 14th St, Oakland, CA)
 Leader Lancer

LEAF 
(Leading Edge Air Foils, Peyton, CO)
LEAF Graffiti
LEAF Trike
LEAF Tukan
LEAF Antares 503
LEAF Antares 582

Lear 
(1929: (Archie and Claude) Lear Aircraft Corp, Pratt KS. 1954: (William P) Lear Inc, Santa Monica, CA, 1959: Established Swiss-Amaerican Aviation Corp, St Gallen, Switzerland. 1962: Lear-Siegler Corp. Jan 1963: Lear Aircraft Co, Wichita, KS)
 Lear 1929 Biplane
 Lear 1930 Monoplane
 LearStar

Learjet 
(Learjet Industries Inc. 1969: Gates Learjet Corp, 6868 S Plumer Ave, Tucson, AZ, 1990: Acquired by Bombardier Inc, Canada (q.v.). 1997: Bombardier flight test center moved to Learjet facility, Wichita, KS)
 Learjet 23
 Learjet 24
 Learjet 25
 Learjet 28
 Learjet 29 Longhorn
 Learjet 31
 Learjet 35
 Learjet 36
 Learjet 40
 Learjet 45
 Learjet 50
 Learjet 55
 Learjet 60
 Learjet 65
 Learjet 70
 Learjet 75
 Learjet C-21A

Learfan 
(Learfan Ltd.)
 Lear Fan 2100

Lebed 
 Lebed I
 Lebed II
 Lebed III
 Lebed IV
 Lebed V
 Lebed VI
 Lebed VII
 Lebed VIII
 Lebed IX
 Lebed X
 Lebed XI
 Lebed XII
 Lebed XIII
 Lebed XIV
 Lebed XV
 Lebed XVI
 Lebed XVII
 Lebed XVIII
 Lebed XIX
 Lebed XXI
 Lebed XXII
 Lebed XXIII
 Lebed XXIV
 LM-1

Leblanc 
(Albert Leblanc)
 Leblanc L.04A
 Leblanc L.52

Lebouder 
(Robert Lebouder)
 Lebouder Autoplane

Lecoin-Damblanc
(Louis Lecoin and Louis Damblanc)
 Lecoin-Damblanc Alérion

Lederlin 
 Lederlin 380L

Leduc 
(René Leduc et Fils)
 Leduc 0.10
 Leduc 0.16
 Leduc 0.20
 Leduc 0.21
 Leduc 0.22

Leduc 
(René Leduc, amateur constructor)
 Leduc RL-12
 Leduc RL-16
 Leduc RL-19
 Leduc RL-21
 Leduc RL-24

Lee 

(Lee Inman School of Flying, Eugene, OR)
 Lee L-1P-S
 Lee L-2P-T

Lee-Richards 
(Cedric Lee & G. Tilghman Richards)
 Lee-Richards annular bilpane
 Lee-Richards annular biplane glider
 Lee-Richards annular monoplane

Lefebvre 
(Robert Lefebvre)
 Lefebvre MP-204 Busard
 Lefebvre MP-205 Busard

Legallois 
(Roland Legallois)
 Legallois 01

Legend Aircraft 
(Performance Aircraft Inc (Pres: Jeff Ackland), Olathe, KS, 2002: Legend Aircraft Inc)
 Legend Turbine Legend
 Legend JC 100

Legend Lite 
(Legend Lite Inc, New Hamburg, Ontario, Canada)
Legend Lite SS-11 Skywatch

Leger 
(Claude Léger)
 Léger JCL.01

Leger 
(René Léger)
 Léger RL.1
 Léger RL.2
 Léger RL.3

Leger Aviation 
(Leger Aviation SARL, Archiac, France)
Leger Pataplume 1
Leger Pataplume 2

Leglaive 
(Fernand Leglaive)
 Leglaive Miniplane
 Leglaive-Gaultier LG.150 (Fernand Leglaive & Roger Gaultier)

Léglise 
(see SOSA)

Legrand-Simon 
(Paul Legrand et Michel Simon)
 Legrand-Simon LS-50 Dauphine
 Legrand-Simon LS-60

Leighnor 
(William C Leighnor, Hutchinson, KS)
 Leighnor Mirage 2
 Leighnor W-4 (a.k.a. WL-4,  or Mirage)

Leins 
(Ballard Leins, Tinsley Park and Auburn, IN)
 Leins Bal-Aire

Leineweber 
(Curtis, William, and Victor H Leineweber, Chicago, IL)
 Leineweber 1921 Helicopter

Leka 
(Leka Aeroplane Co (Theodor & Thermistocles M Leka, Naum P Mele), New York, NY)
 Leka 1930 Aeroplane

Lemaire 
(René Lemaire)
 Lemaire RL.1
 Lemaire ARL-11 Babysquale

Lemberger 
 Lemberger LD20b

leMire 
(William LeMire )
 LeMire Proud Bird

Lemp 
((First name unrecorded) Lemp, Augusta, GA)
 Lemp B

Lenderpergt 
(Patrick Lenderpergt)
 Lenderpergt LP.1 Sybille

Lenert 
(Lenert Aircraft Co, Pentwater MI. c.1940: Lenert Aviation Corp, 1220 Vance St, Toledo, OH)
 Lenert 1927 Biplane
 Lenert B
 Lenert C
 Lenert PT-2 (a.k.a. Zephyr)

Leonard 
(George W Leonard, Santa Ana, CA)
 Leonard Special

Leonardo
(Leonardo S.p.A / Leonardo-Finmeccanica / Finmeccanica)
 Leonardo M-345 (re-vamped S.211)
 Leonardo DRS T-100 Integrated Training System
 Leonardo SW-4 Solo

Leopoldoff 
 Leopoldoff L-3
 Leopoldoff L-31 Colibri
 Leopoldoff L-32 Colibri
 Leopoldoff L-4 Colibri
 Leopoldoff L-5 Colibri
 Leopoldoff L-53 Colibri
 Leopoldoff L-55 Colibri
 Leopoldoff L-6 Colibri
 Leopoldoff L-7 Colibri

Lepicier 
(Evangeliste Lepicier, Brooklyn, NY)
 Lepicier A

Lerho 
(Lerho Laboratories Inc, Pittsburgh, PA)
 Lerho Terraplane

Leroy
(G. Leroy)
 Leroy Motoplaneur - LEROY G., Aéroc-Club de l'Eure, Professeur Technique à l'Ecole Professionelle d'Évreux

Les Mureaux
see ANF Les Mureaux

Lesher 
(Prof Edgar J Lesher, Univ of Michigan, MI)
 Lesher Nomad
 Lesher Teal

Let 
(Letalski Konstrukcijski - Ljubljana)
 Let LK-1

Let 
 Let Ae-45S
 Let Ae-145		
 Let C-11	
 Let L-200 Morava	
 Let L-410 Turbolet	
 Let L-610
 Aircraft Industries L 410 NG
 Let LF-109 Pionýr
 Let L-13 Blaník
 Let L-23 Super Blaník
 Let L-33 Solo
 Let TG-10

LET 
(Letecké Zavody, Narodni Podnik)
 LET Brigadyr
 LET C-11
 Let L-200 Morava
 LET XLD-40 Mir
 LET L-40 MetaSokol
 LET L-410
 LET L-420
 LET Z-37 Cmelak
 LET L-610
 LET Aero 45S / Aero 145

LET Mraz 
 M.1 Sokol
 M.2 Skaut
 M.3 Bonzo

Let-Mont 
(Vikýřovice, Czech Republic)
Let-Mont Piper UL
Let-Mont Tulak

Leteneur 
(Charles Leteneur)
 Leteneur 1947 aeroplane

Letord 
(Société d'Aviation Letord / 	Établissements Letord)
 Letord Let.1
 Letord Let.2
 Letord Let.3
 Letord Let.4
 Letord Let.5
 Letord Let.6
 Letord Let.7
 Letord 9Bn 2
 Letord-Béchereau 2

Letord & Niepce 
 Letord & Niepce Monoplan 1909

Letov 
(Vojenska Tovarna na Letadla Letov)
Letov Š-1
Letov Š-2
Letov Š-3
Letov Š-4
Letov Š-5
Letov Š-6
Letov Š-7
Letov Š-8
Letov Š-9
Letov Š-10
Letov Š-11
Letov Š-12
Letov Š-13
Letov Š-14
Letov Š-15
Letov Š-16
Letov Š-16J
Letov Š-116
Letov Š-216
Letov Š-316
Letov Š-416
Letov Š-516
Letov Š-616
Letov Š-716
Letov Š-816
Letov Š-916
Letov Š-17
Letov Š-18
Letov Š-118
Letov Š-218
Letov Š-19
Letov Š-20
Letov Š-21
Letov Š-22
Letov Š-25
Letov Š-27
Letov Š-28
Letov Š-128
Letov Š-228
Letov Š-328
Letov Š-428
Letov Š-528
Letov Š-31
Letov Š-131
Letov Š-231
Letov Š-331
Letov Š-431
Letov Š-32
Letov Š-33
Letov Š-39
Letov Š-139
Letov Š-239
Letov Š-50
 Letov L-8
 Letov TOM-8
Letov L-101
Letov L-290
Letov LF-107 Luňák
Letov XLF-207 Laminar
Letov SH-1 
Letov SM-1
Letov Sm A 1 
Letov LK-1
Letov LK-2 Sluka
Letov LK-3
Letov ST-4 Aztek
Letov TL-32 Typhoon

Levasseur 
(Sociéte Pierre Levasseur Aéronautique)
 Levasseur PL.1
 Levasseur PL.1 T-O-3
 Levasseur PL.2
 Levasseur PL.3 AM3
 Levasseur PL.4
 Levasseur PL.5
 Levasseur PL.5 C2B 1926 Two-seater biplane naval fighter. 3 examples constructed. Sesquiplane wing layout . Fuselage wooden, but with a marine hull design. 
 Levasseur PL.6
 Levasseur PL.7
 Levasseur PL.8
 Levasseur PL 8 'Oiseau Blanc'
 Levasseur PL.9
 Levasseur PL.10
 Levasseur PL.101
 Levasseur PL.104 1935 Armed reconnaissance three-seat biplane project with a Hispano-Suiza 12 Xbr engine.
 Levasseur PL.105 1935 Armed reconnaissance three-seat biplane project with a Hispano-Suiza 9 V engine.
 Levasseur PL.106 1935 Armed reconnaissance three-seat biplane project with a Hispano-Suiza 12 Xbr engine with PL 15 radiator layout.
 Levasseur PL.107
 Levasseur PL.108
 Levasseur PL 109 1939 No details
 Levasseur PL.11
 Levasseur PL.12
 Levasseur PL.14
 Levasseur PL.15
 Levasseur PL.151
 Levasseur PL.154
 Levasseur PL.200
 Levasseur PL.201
 Levasseur PL.300 1935 Biplane single engine torpedo bomber. Project only with enclosed cockpit and folding wings. Powered by Hispano-Suiza 12 Ybrg. Two seater as a bomber and three seat in the reconnaissance role.
 Levasseur PL.301 1935 Biplane single engine torpedo bomber floatplane. Project only with enclosed cockpit and exposed rear-gunner position. Powered by Hispano-Suiza 12 Ybrg.
 Levasseur PL.400
 Levasseur PL.401
 Levasseur-Abrial A-1
 Levasseur Wibault (1922) night-bomber design
 Levasseur Saint Raphël
 Levasseur Landeroin-Robert Monoplan 1913 Three-seat experimental triple wing monoplane with distinctive rollover frame-come forward wing support.

Levi 
(Renato Levi)
 Levi RL3 Monsoon
 Levi RL6 Go-Plane

LeVier
(Tony LeVier)
 LeVier Cosmic Wind

Levy 
(Hydravions Georges Levy)
 Levy G.L.40
 Levy Type R
 Levy-Besson (Georges Levy, Marcel Besson)
 Levy-Besson HB.2 (Georges Levy, Marcel Besson)
 Levy-Biche 4 HO.2
 Levy-Biche LB.2 (Jean Biche / Constructions Aéronautiques J Levy)
 Levy-Biche LB.4
 Levy-Biche LB.6 (Jean Biche / Constructions Aéronautiques J Levy)
 Levy-Lepen R

Lewis 
(Charles H Lewis, Denver, CO)
 Lewis 6425

Lewis & Vought 
(Lewis & Vought Corporation)
 Lewis & Vought VE-7
 Lewis & Vought VE-8
 Lewis & Vought VE-9

Lewis-American 
((Paul) Lewis-American Airways Inc/Gray Goose Airplane Co, Denver, CO)
 Lewis-American A
 Lewis-American Auto-Airplane
 Lewis-American Gray Goose

Leyat 
(Marcel Leyat)
 Leyat biplane
 Leyat glider
 Leyat convertible biplane
 Leyat 1928 convertible biplane
 Leyat Hélica Avion

Leyat-Jacquemin 
(Marcel Leyat et André Jacquemin)
 Leyat-Jacquemin 1933 monoplane
 Leyat-Jacquemin 1934 monoplane
 Leyat-Jacquemin glider

LFG 
(Luftfahrzeug Gesellschaft m.b.H. Berlin-Charlottenburg) - (a.k.a. LFG Roland / LFG Stralsund / LFG Bittersfeld)
 LFG Roland Pfeilflieger
 LFG Roland C.I
 LFG Roland C.II
 LFG Roland C.III
 LFG Roland C.V
 LFG Roland C.VIII
 LFG Roland D.I
 LFG Roland D.II
 LFG Roland D.III
 LFG Roland D.IV
 LFG Roland D.V
 LFG Roland D.VI
 LFG Roland D.VII
 LFG Roland D.VII
 LFG Roland D.VIII
 LFG Roland D.IX
 LFG Roland D.X
 LFG Roland D.XI
 LFG Roland D.XII
 LFG Roland D.XIII
 LFG Roland D.XIV
 LFG Roland D.XV (I)
 LFG Roland D.XV (II)
 LFG Roland D.XVI
 LFG Roland D.XVII
 LFG Roland Dr.I
 LFG Roland E.I
 LFG Roland G.I
 LFG Roland R.I
 LFG V 1
 LFG V 2
 LFG V 3 Susanna
 LFG V 3a Susanne
 LFG V 8
 LFG V 13 Strela
 LFG V 130 Strela
 LFG V 14
 LFG V 15
 LFG V 16
 LFG V 17
 LFG V 18 Sassnitz
 LFG V 20 Arkona
 LFG V 23
 LFG V 25
 LFG V 26
 LFG V 27
 LFG V 28
 LFG V 36
 LFG V 39
 LFG V 40
 LFG V 42
 LFG V 44
 LFG V 52
 LFG V 58
 LFG V 59
 LFG V 60
 LFG V 61
 LFG V 101 Jasmund
 LFG Bitterfeld W
 LFG Bitterfeld W.16
 LFG Bitterfeld WD
 LFG Stralsund V 19

LFU
(Leichtflugtechnik-Union)
 LFU 205

LH Aviation 
 LH Aviation LH-10 Ellipse

References

Further reading

External links

 List Of Aircraft (L)

fr:Liste des aéronefs (I-M)